Jiangxi Dark Horse Junior Football Club is a professional Chinese football club that currently participates in the China League Two. The team is based in Yichun, Jiangxi.

History
Yichun Jiangxi Tungsten V Tiger F.C. was founded in November 2018, and was renamed as Yichun Jiangxi Tungsten Grand Tiger F.C. before participating in Chinese Champions League in 2020 and gaining promotion to China League Two, after beating Hebei Jingying Zhihai in the semi-finals. In 2021, the club changed its name to Yichun Grand Tiger F.C. In 2022, the club changed its name to Jiangxi Dark Horse Junior F.C.

Name history
2018–2019 Yichun Jiangxi Tungsten V Tiger F.C. 宜春江钨V虎
2020 Yichun Jiangxi Tungsten Grand Tiger F.C. 宜春江钨威虎
2021 Yichun Grand Tiger F.C. 宜春威虎
2022 Jiangxi Dark Horse Junior F.C. 江西黑马青年

Players

Current squad

References

External links
Soccerway

Yichun Grand Tiger F.C.
Football clubs in China
Association football clubs established in 2018
Sport in Jiangxi
2018 establishments in China